Polari is a form of slang or cant used in Britain by some actors, circus and fairground showmen, professional wrestlers, merchant navy sailors, criminals, sex workers and the gay subculture. There is some debate about its origins, but it can be traced back to at least the 19th century and possibly as far as the 16th century. There is a long-standing connection with Punch and Judy street puppet performers, who traditionally used Polari to converse.

Terminology
Alternate spellings include Parlare, Parlary, Palare, Palarie and Palari.

Description

Polari is a mixture of Romance (Italian or Mediterranean Lingua Franca), Romani, rhyming slang, sailor slang and thieves' cant. Later it expanded to contain words from the Yiddish language and from 1960s drug subculture slang. According to a Channel 4 television documentary, there was once (in London) an "East End" version which stressed Cockney rhyming slang and a "West End" version which stressed theatrical and Classical influences. There was some interchange between the two.

Usage
From the 19th century on, Polari was used in London fishmarkets, the theatre, fairgrounds and circuses, hence the many borrowings from Romani. As many homosexual men worked in theatrical entertainment it was also used among the gay subculture, at a time when homosexual activity was illegal, to disguise homosexuals from hostile outsiders and undercover policemen. It was also used extensively in the British Merchant Navy, where many gay men joined ocean liners and cruise ships as waiters, stewards and entertainers.

William Shakespeare used the term bona (good, attractive) in Henry IV, Part 2, part of the expression bona roba (a lady wearing an attractive outfit). However, "there's little written evidence of Polari before the 1890s", according to Peter Gilliver, associate editor of the Oxford English Dictionary. The dictionary's entry for rozzer (policeman), for example, includes this quote from an 1893 book (P. H. Emerson's Signor Lippo – Burnt Cork Artiste): "If the rozzers was to see him in bona clobber they'd take him for a gun." (If the police were to see him dressed in this fine manner, they would know that he is a thief.)

The almost identical Parlyaree has been spoken in fairgrounds since at least the 17th century and continues to be used by show travellers in England and Scotland. As theatrical booths, circus acts and menageries were once a common part of European fairs, it is likely that the roots of Polari/Parlyaree lie in the period before both theatre and circus became independent of the fairgrounds. The Parlyaree spoken on fairgrounds tends to borrow much more from Romani, as well as other languages and argots spoken by travelling people, such as thieves' cant and backslang.

Henry Mayhew gave a verbatim account of Polari as part of an interview with a Punch and Judy showman in the 1850s. The discussion he recorded references the arrival of Punch in England, crediting these early shows to a performer from Italy called Porcini (John Payne Collier's account calls him Porchini, a literal rendering of the Italian pronunciation). Mayhew provides the following:

There are additional accounts of particular words that relate to puppet performance: "'' – figures, frame, scenes, properties. '' – call, or unknown tongue" ("unknown" is a reference to the "swazzle", a voice modifier used by Punch performers, the structure of which was a longstanding trade secret).

Decline
Polari had begun to fall into disuse amongst the gay subculture by the late 1960s. The popularity of Julian and Sandy, played by Hugh Paddick and Kenneth Williams (introduced in the radio programme Round the Horne, in the 1960s) ensured that some of this secret language became public knowledge. The need for a secret subculture code declined with the partial decriminalisation of adult homosexual acts in England and Wales under the Sexual Offences Act 1967.

Entry into mainstream slang

A number of words from Polari have entered mainstream slang. The list below includes words in general use with the meanings listed: acdc, barney, blag, butch, camp, khazi, cottaging, hoofer, mince, ogle, scarper, slap, strides, tod, [rough] trade.

The Polari word , meaning inferior or tacky, has an uncertain etymology. Michael Quinion states that it is probably from the sixteenth-century Italian word , meaning "a despicable person". There are a number of false etymologies, many based on acronyms—"Not Available For Fucking", "Normal As Fuck", etc.—though these are backronyms. The phrase "naff off" was used euphemistically in place of "fuck off" along with the intensifier "naffing" in Billy Liar by Keith Waterhouse (1959). Usage of "naff" increased in the 1970s when the television sitcom Porridge employed it as an alternative to expletives which were not considered broadcastable at the time. Princess Anne allegedly famously told a reporter, "Why don't you just naff off" at the Badminton horse trials in April 1982, but it has since been claimed that this was a bowdlerised version of what she actually said.

"" (or ), meaning to smarten up, style or improve something, became commonplace in the mid-2000s, having been used in the 2003 United States TV series Queer Eye for the Straight Guy and What Not to Wear. "", an alternate spelling of the word, was popularised by drag queen Jasmine Masters after her appearance on the seventh season of RuPaul’s Drag Race in 2015.

In popular culture

James Thomson added a glossary of words he thought "obsolete" in his 1825 work The Seasons and Castle of Indolence. He chose to write "Castle of Indolence" "In the manner of Edmund Spenser". Two words he by then thought needed explaining were: "Eke", meaning "also", pronounced like Polari's "Eek", (face); and "Gear or Geer", meaning "furniture, equipage, dress". This last usage being maintained to this day in slang, and being then-contemporary, too, by 1960s Polari-users, avoiding Thomson's stated complete obsolescence.
 Polari ('Polare') was popularised in the 1960s on the popular BBC radio show Round the Horne starring Kenneth Horne. Camp Polari-speaking characters Julian and Sandy were played by Hugh Paddick and Kenneth Williams.
 In the Doctor Who serial Carnival of Monsters from 1973, Vorg, a showman, believing the Doctor to also be a showman, attempts to converse with him in Polari. The Doctor states that he does not understand him.
 In 1987, character Ralph Filthy, a theatrical agent played by Nigel Planer in the BBC TV series Filthy Rich & Catflap, regularly used Polari.
 In 1990, Morrissey released the single "Piccadilly Palare" containing a number of lyrics in Polari and exploring a subculture in which Polari was used. "Piccadilly Palare" is also the first song appearing on Morrissey's compilation album Bona Drag, whose title is itself taken from Polari.
 In 1990, in Issue #35 of Grant Morrison's run of Doom Patrol, the character Danny the Street is introduced; they speak English that is heavily flavored with Polari, with "bona to vada" ("good to see [you]") being their favourite way of greeting friends.
 In the 1998 film Velvet Goldmine, two characters speak Polari while in a London nightclub. This scene contains subtitles for viewers not familiar with the language.
In 2002, two books on Polari were published, Polari: The Lost Language of Gay Men and Fantabulosa: A Dictionary of Polari and Gay Slang, both by Paul Baker.
 In 2015, filmmakers Brian Fairbairn and Karl Eccleston made Putting on the Dish, a short film entirely in Polari.
 The 2016 David Bowie album Blackstar contains a song, "Girl Loves Me", which utilises Polari.
 In 2017, a service at Westcott House, Cambridge (a Church of England theological college) was conducted in Polari; the service was held by trainee priests to commemorate LGBT History Month; following media attention, Chris Chivers, the Principal, expressed his regret.
 In the 2017 EP Ricky, gay singer Sakima used Polari.
 In 2019, the first-ever opera in Polari, The Sins of the Cities of the Plain (based on the book of the same title), premiered at Espacio Turina in Seville, Spain. The libretto was entirely written in Polari by librettist and playwright Fabrizio Funari (b. 1991) while the music was composed by Germán Alonso (b. 1984) with cantaor Niño de Elche (b. 1985) in the main role. The opera was produced and performed by instrumental ensemble Proyecto OCNOS, formed by Pedro Rojas-Ogáyar and Gustavo A. Domínguez Ojalvo, with the support of ICAS Sevilla, Fundación BBVA and The Librettist.
 The same year, the English-language localisation of the Japanese video game Dragon Quest Builders 2 included a character called Jules, who spoke in Polari with non-standard capitalisation.
 Also in 2019, Reaktion Books published Fabulosa!: The Story of Polari, Britain's Secret Gay Language, by Paul Baker.
 In the 2020 film Roald & Beatrix: The Tail of the Curious Mouse, a young Roald Dahl, running away from home, meets a man (played by Bill Bailey) who speaks in Polari.

Glossary
Numbers:

Some words or phrases that may derive from Polari (this is an incomplete list):

Usage examples
Omies and palones of the jury, vada well at the eek of the poor ome who stands before you, his lallies trembling. – taken from "Bona Law", one of the Julian and Sandy sketches from Round The Horne, written by Barry Took and Marty Feldman

Translation: "Men and women of the jury, look well at the face of the poor man who stands before you, his legs trembling."

So bona to vada...oh you! Your lovely eek and your lovely riah. – taken from "Piccadilly Palare", a song by Morrissey

Translation: "So good to see...oh you! Your lovely face and your lovely hair."

As feely ommes...we would zhoosh our riah, powder our eeks, climb into our bona new drag, don our batts and troll off to some bona bijou bar. In the bar we would stand around with our sisters, vada the bona cartes on the butch omme ajax who, if we fluttered our ogle riahs at him sweetly, might just troll over to offer a light for the unlit vogue clenched between our teeth. – taken from Parallel Lives, the memoirs of renowned gay journalist Peter Burton

Translation: "As young men...we would style our hair, powder our faces, climb into our great new clothes, don our shoes and wander/walk off to some great little bar. In the bar we would stand around with our gay companions, look at the great genitals on the butch man nearby who, if we fluttered our eyelashes at him sweetly, might just wander/walk over to offer a light for the unlit cigarette clenched between our teeth."

In the Are You Being Served? episode "The Old Order Changes", Captain Peacock asks Mr Humphries to get "some strides for the omi with the naff riah" (i.e. trousers for the fellow with the unstylish hair).

See also

 African American Vernacular English (sometimes called Ebonics)
 Bahasa Binan
 Boontling
 Caló (Chicano)
 Carny, North American fairground cant
 Gayle language
 Gay slang
 Grypsera
 IsiNgqumo
 Lavender linguistics
 Lunfardo and Vesre
 Pajubá
 Julian and Sandy
 Rotwelsch
 Shelta
 Swardspeak
 Verlan
 Lubunca

References

Bibliography

External links

 Chris Denning's article on Polari with bibliography
 The Polari Bible compiled by The Manchester Sisters of Perpetual Indulgence
 Polari Mission exhibit (archived) at the University of Manchester's John Rylands Library
 Colin Richardson, The Guardian, 17 January 2005, "What brings you trolling back, then?"
 Liverpool Museums: The secret language of polari (archived)
 Paul Clevett's Polari Translator
 Putting it on the Dish, a 2015 short film featuring Polari extensively 
 A brief history of Polari: the curious after-life of the dead language for gay men, 8 February 2017.

English language in England
English-based argots
English language in London
British slang
LGBT linguistics
LGBT culture in the United Kingdom
Gay working-class culture